Mare were a Canadian band from Toronto, who fused sludge metal with more experimental traits such as jazz, unusual time signatures and Gregorian chant. Mare consisted of Tyler Semrick-Palmateer on vocals and guitar, Rob Shortil on bass, and Caleb Collins on drums. The band recorded and released several demos, one of which was re-issued by Hydra Head Records in 2004  as an EP. They also contributed a cover of the track "Night Goat" on the We Reach: The Music of the Melvins compilation. 

In 2015, Caleb and Tyler reformed the band as a two-piece.

Discography 
Self Titled EP (2004/Hydra Head Records)

References

Post-metal musical groups
Sludge metal musical groups
Musical groups established in 2004
Musical groups disestablished in 2007
Musical groups from Toronto
2004 establishments in Ontario
2007 disestablishments in Ontario